Jordie Briels (born 26 November 1991) is a Dutch professional footballer who plays as a midfielder. Briels has previously played for Fortuna Sittard and Scottish club Dundee United.

Club career
Born in Weert, Briels played in the youth academy of Belgian side Genk, but signed professional terms with Fortuna Sittard in 2012. Briels signed a one-year contract with Scottish club Dundee United in July 2017, spending the year with the club before being released following the end of his contract.

Career statistics

References

External links
 

1991 births
Living people
Sportspeople from Weert
Association football midfielders
Dutch footballers
Dutch expatriate footballers
K.R.C. Genk players
Fortuna Sittard players
Dundee United F.C. players
TOP Oss players
Eerste Divisie players
Scottish Professional Football League players
Expatriate footballers in Scotland
Expatriate footballers in Belgium
Dutch expatriate sportspeople in Scotland
Dutch expatriate sportspeople in Belgium
Footballers from Limburg (Netherlands)